John William Kyle (September 12, 1898 – May 25, 1974), was an American football player. A native of Gary, Indiana, he played college football for Indiana University. He also played professional football in the National Football League (NFL) as a fullback for the Cleveland Indians in 1923. He was selected by a poll of newspaper reporters in NFL cities as the third-team fullback on the 1923 All-Pro Team. He was the football coach at Gary Froebel High School for many years. He became director of physical education for the Gary school system in 1952 and athletic director from 1955 to 1966. He did in 1974 at age 75 in a nursing home in Valparaiso, Indiana.

References

1898 births
1974 deaths
American football fullbacks
Cleveland Indians (NFL) players
Indiana Hoosiers football players
Players of American football from Gary, Indiana